Town Island (Fo Tau Fan Chau), also known as Dawn Island is an island in the New Territories of Hong Kong. It is located south of the former High Island, in the Sai Kung District of the territory.

A drug rehabilitation centre was established on the island in 1976. It is run by Operation Dawn.

The electricity for the island is supplied from photovoltaic panels by CLP Group.

The island is served by a ferry route from Sai Kung twice a day, except public holidays.

See also

List of islands and peninsulas of Hong Kong

References

External links

 Chan, Tin-kuen, Anthony, "Parade for the queen: safeguarding the intangible heritage of the Tin Hau Sea Ritual in Leung Shuen Wan, Sai Kung", University of Hong Kong dissertation, 2006

Sai Kung District
Islands of Hong Kong
Populated places in Hong Kong